A brickyard or brickfield is a place or yard where bricks are made, fired, and stored, or sometimes sold or otherwise distributed from. Brick makers work in a brick yard. A brick yard may be constructed near natural sources of clay or on or near a construction site if necessity or design requires the bricks to be made locally.

Brickfield and Brickfields became  common place names for former brickfields in south east England. The children's building toy called "Brickyard" (stylized as Ba) is named after the place.

See also
 Brickworks, another type of place where bricks are made, often on a larger scale, and with mechanization
 Clay pit, a quarry or mine for clay
 Kiln, the type of high heat oven that bricks are baked in

References

Sources

External links

Bricks